The 41st Cuban National Series saw a surprise champion, as Holguín engineered a strong season to edge Santiago de Cuba and win Group C. The Sabuesos then upended Camagüey, Villa Clara and finally Sancti Spíritus—in a 2-1 seventh game—to take their first title.

Regular season standings

Western zone

Eastern zone

Playoffs

References

Cuban National Series seasons
Base
Base
Cuba